Planetar  may refer to:
 Planetar (astronomy), a type of extrasolar planet
 Planetar (Dungeons & Dragons), a fictional type of angel in Dungeons & Dragons